The Taft Broadcasting Company (also known as Taft Television and Radio Company, Incorporated) was an American media conglomerate based in Cincinnati, Ohio.

The company was rooted in the family of William Howard Taft, the 27th President of the United States. In 1879, William Howard's brother, Charles Phelps Taft, purchased two afternoon newspapers in Cincinnati, The Times and The Cincinnati Daily Star, merging them into the Cincinnati Times-Star in 1880. It was during the tenure of the merged paper's second publisher, Hulbert Taft Sr., son of Charles and William Howard's half-brother, Peter Rawson Taft II, that the newspaper also became involved in broadcasting.

The company was the owner of such major media and entertainment properties as Hanna-Barbera Productions, Hanna-Barbera Pty, Ltd./Taft-Hardie Group Pty. Ltd., Worldvision Enterprises, Ruby-Spears Productions, KECO Entertainment and many television and radio stations. It also owned 50% of CIC Video's Australian operations, CIC-Taft Home Video.

The company went through a large reorganization period starting in the late 1980s with its acquisition by Carl Lindner, Jr. to become Great American Broadcasting. Shortly after filing for bankruptcy in 1993, it became Citicasters and was, in 1999, acquired by Clear Channel Communications, which was renamed iHeartMedia in 2014. Taft — as Citicasters — remained incorporated as a holding company within iHeartMedia until 2020.

History

1939–1959
The Taft family's involvement in broadcasting began in 1939 as Radio Cincinnati, Inc., when the Cincinnati Times-Star purchased WKRC radio from CBS.

In April 1949, Taft's first TV station, WKRC-TV in Cincinnati, began broadcasting.

In 1951, in its first expansion outside Ohio, Radio Cincinnati acquired a 20 percent interest in WBIR-AM-FM in Knoxville, Tennessee from father-and-son owners J. Lindsay and Gilmore Nunn.  A year-and-a-half later, the Taft family increased its stake to 30 percent when the Nunns sold additional shares in that station to Martha and Robert Ashe, John P. Hart, and Radio Cincinnati.

In 1953, Radio Cincinnati purchased WTVN-TV (now WSYX) in Columbus, Ohio, from Picture-Waves, Inc., controlled by Toledo attorney and broadcaster Edward Lamb.

In 1954, the company bought WHKC radio in Columbus from United Broadcasting, then-owners of WHK in Cleveland; WHKC is renamed WTVN.

In August 1956 WBIR-TV in Knoxville began broadcasting, under the same ownership structure as the WBIR radio stations.

In 1957, Radio Cincinnati purchased WBRC-AM-FM-TV in Birmingham, Alabama, from Storer Broadcasting.

In 1958, the Cincinnati Times-Star was merged into the Cincinnati Post, published by the E.W. Scripps Company. Radio Cincinnati also purchased WKXP-TV in Lexington, Kentucky, from local interests and changed its call letters to WKYT-TV.

In 1959, the company acquired the remaining 70 percent of WBIR-AM-FM-TV in Knoxville.  Also in 1959, the Taft family merged its broadcasting subsidiaries into one, using the Taft Broadcasting Company name.  Subsidiaries WBRC, Inc. (WBRC-AM-FM-TV), WTVN, Inc. (WTVN-TV), Radio Cincinnati, Inc. (WKRC-AM-FM-TV and WKYT-TV), and Radio Columbus, Inc. (WTVN-AM-FM) were merged on June 23, 1959 and WBIR, Inc. (WBIR-AM-FM-TV) was merged on February 1, 1960.

1960–1979

In 1960, Taft launched WTVN-FM in Columbus (it is now WLVQ).  A year later the company sold the WBIR stations in Knoxville to Multimedia Inc. of Greenville, South Carolina.

In 1961, Taft signed a group affiliation deal with ABC, converting all of the stations Taft had owned at that time, to the network. With WTVN-TV already an ABC affiliate, WBRC-TV, WKYT, and WKRC-TV switched to the network. This came after that network's founder Leonard Goldenson persuaded Taft president Hulbert Taft Jr., a longtime friend, to switch several of the company's stations to ABC.

In 1963, Taft purchased several stations from Transcontinent Television Corporation: WDAF-AM-FM-TV in Kansas City, Missouri, WGR-AM-FM-TV in Buffalo, New York, and WNEP-TV in Scranton, Pennsylvania.

In October 1966, Taft purchased the Hanna-Barbera cartoon studio from its founders, Joseph Barbera, William Hanna and George Sidney.  Several months later in April 1967, the firm sold WKYT-TV to a subsidiary of Kentucky Central Life Insurance Company.

On November 10, 1967, Taft Broadcasting president and chairman Hulbert Taft Jr. died in liquid propane gas-related explosion in a bomb shelter he had built on his property in the Cincinnati suburb of Indian Hill. Days after his death, his son Dudley S. Taft replaced him on the firm's board of directors, and he eventually became head of the company.

In 1969, Taft purchased WIBF-TV in Philadelphia and changed its call letters to WTAF-TV.  The FCC initially granted Taft a waiver to keep both WTAF-TV and WNEP-TV, but later reversed itself in 1973 (four years later), and Taft sold the Scranton outlet to the station's management, who formed NEP Communications.

In 1970, Taft formed Rhodes Productions, a television syndication arm for various independent TV programs, including those of Hanna-Barbera.

In 1972, Taft opened its first theme park, Kings Island, outside of Cincinnati. Taft owned five other theme parks through its KECO Entertainment division. WBRC radio and WBRC-FM in Birmingham are sold to Mooney Broadcasting. In 1973, Taft sold WNEP-TV in Scranton to its management, called NEP Communications.

In 1974, Taft acquired Top 40 station KQV and rock outlet WDVE, both in Pittsburgh, from ABC Radio.

In 1975, a second theme park based on Kings Island, Kings Dominion, opened outside of Richmond. Rhodes Productions was renamed to Taft, H-B Program Sales while Taft, H-B International was established as the new overseas television distribution arm for the company. Rhodes was eventually revived two weeks later under Filmways. Carowinds in Charlotte, North Carolina was acquired by the company in 1975 from the Carowinds Corporation.

In 1979, Taft purchased WDCA-TV in Washington, D.C. from the Superior Tube Company.  Around this same period, Taft also acquired independent distributor Worldvision Enterprises (formerly a division of ABC) and production company QM Productions.

1980–1987

In 1980, Taft acquired Sunn Classic Pictures and two additional Schick divisions. Sunn Classic was reincorporated as Taft International Pictures and QM Productions was reincorporated into Taft Entertainment Television, although the QM name and logo continued to be used on-screen and for copyright purposes until 1983.

In 1981, Taft acquired Ruby-Spears Productions from Filmways. Around this time, Taft split its operation into two "subdivisions": the "Taft Entertainment Company" (which included Hanna-Barbera, Ruby-Spears, Worldvision, the theme parks, Taft International Pictures, and Taft Entertainment Television). The other was the "Taft Television & Radio Co, Inc.". Also in 1981, Taft, in partnership with The Great-West Life Assurance Company of Winnipeg, opened Canada's Wonderland, a theme park near Toronto.

In 1982, KQV in Pittsburgh was sold to its general manager Robert W. Dickey and newspaper publisher Richard Mellon Scaife, under the "Calvary, Inc." banner.

In 1983, Taft exchanged WGR-TV in Buffalo to General Cinema Corporation's Coral Television subsidiary in return for WCIX in Miami. In 1984, the Taft Entertainment Company was reorganized, in order to set up various theatrical projects that was made by the studio, such as On Wings with Eagles. Also that year, it formed a partnership with Keith Barish to start out a joint venture, with a worldwide distribution alliance at 20th Century Fox to distribute the films. On August 20, 1986, Taft/Barish Productions, the feature film joint venture between the broadcasting group and Keith Barish Productions had inked a ten-picture distribution deal with Tri-Star Pictures for $200 million, to handle domestic distribution of the films at a rate of four to six films per year.

In 1985, Taft purchased Gulf Broadcasting, which includes KTXA in Fort Worth; KTXH in Houston; WTSP in St. Petersburg, Florida; KTSP-TV (now KSAZ-TV) in Phoenix; KESQ-TV in Palm Springs, California; and WGHP in High Point, North Carolina. As a result, Taft sold several radio stations to CBS to comply with FCC rules. KESQ-TV was spun off to former Gulf Broadcasting executive E. Grant Fitts.
In October 1986, WTAF-TV in Philadelphia and WCIX in Miami became charter affiliates of the Fox Broadcasting Company.  One month later, Taft announced the sale of both of those stations along with its three independent stations (WDCA-TV, KTXA, and KTXH) to the TVX Broadcast Group; the sale was completed in April 1987.  Taft also sold WGR radio and WRLT-FM (the former WGR-FM) in Buffalo to Rich Communications, a subsidiary of Buffalo-based Rich Products. In 1987, Taft, wanting to purchase more network-affiliated television stations, is looking to sell Taft Entertainment Group, the entertainment subsidiary of the Taft Broadcasting company to a different buyer, with estimates cost $300 million, and the group had a record production year in 1986 out of 334 animated half hours and 63 live-action half hour programs, to the three networks, to the cable networks, to first-run syndication.

Taft Broadcasting Company was purchased by TFBA Limited Partnership, which included Robert M. Bass as a partner, in April 1987 for $1.43 billion, taking the company private.

Successor companies
Later in 1987, Cincinnati-based businessman Carl Lindner, Jr. became Taft's majority stockholder in a hostile takeover and renamed the company Great American Broadcasting (also known as Great American Communications) following a major restructuring of its operations. The new name came from Linder's insurance company, Great American Insurance. The FCC considered this restructuring to be an ownership change, and told Lindner he could not keep both WTVN-TV and WKRC-TV. As a result, Great American spun off WTVN-TV to Anchor Media, a new firm composed of former Taft Broadcasting board members led by Robert Bass. (The two stations have since been reunited under the Sinclair Broadcast Group, with cross-ownership rules having since been relaxed.) Another new company, led by former Taft Broadcasting president Dudley S. Taft Sr., took the Taft Broadcasting name. This new company retained WGHP and later purchases another Philadelphia station, WPHL-TV.

In 1988, Great American Broadcasting sold Worldvision to Aaron Spelling Productions. Included with Worldvision were outright ownership of all of Great American's programming assets (including the remnants of Taft International Pictures and Taft Entertainment Television), except for the Hanna-Barbera and Ruby-Spears libraries, which remained owned by Great American for the time being. However, Worldvision continued to hold syndication rights until the two animation studios found new owners.

In 1991, Hanna-Barbera, along with much of the original Ruby-Spears library, was acquired by Turner Broadcasting System, which became part of Time Warner in 1996. As part of this deal, syndication rights to the libraries were passed to Turner Program Services (via Turner Entertainment Co.) prior to Time Warner's purchase of Turner. Eventually, TPS was folded into Warner Bros. Television Distribution. The Ruby-Spears studio was spun off and bought back by Joe Ruby and Ken Spears, and operated as an independent operation from then forward.

In 1992, KECO Entertainment, Great American's theme park division, was sold to Paramount Communications (the parent of Paramount Pictures; the parent company was formerly known as Gulf+Western) and became Paramount Parks, later to be acquired by Viacom. (These parks were sold to Cedar Fair Entertainment Co. by CBS in 2006.)  Great American also reacquired WGHP from Dudley Taft.

In 1993, Great American filed for Chapter 11 bankruptcy and renamed to Citicasters Communications. It also sold WKRC radio to Jacor and shut down Electra, a teletext service operated as a joint venture between Taft, Zenith, and Turner Broadcasting's WTBS (now WPCH-TV) in Atlanta.

In 1994, Citicasters sold most of its TV stations, including WDAF-TV and KSAZ-TV to New World Communications, and WBRC and WGHP to the News Corporation's Fox Television Stations unit, which would later acquire the New World chain. Around the same time, when two of the markets switched to ABC via Scripps, Citicasters agreed to a two-station deal with CBS to affiliate with WTSP and WKRC.

In 1996, Citicasters, by then the owner of two television stations, five AM radio stations and 14 FM radio stations, merged with Jacor, which became a subsidiary of Citicasters. Three months after the merger was completed, Jacor exchanged WTSP to Gannett in return for Gannett's radio stations in Los Angeles, San Diego and Tampa. In 1997, as a condition of the merger, Jacor sold WKRQ and the original WDAF-FM (by then KYYS, now KCKC) to American Radio Systems, which would become acquired by Infinity Broadcasting (later renamed CBS Radio) in 1998. Also in 1997, Jacor sold WDAF (AM) (now KCSP) to Entercom.

In 1997, the Worldvision properties that had previously been under Taft and Great American (with the exception of the Hanna-Barbera and most of the Ruby-Spears material) were incorporated into Republic Pictures (today part of CBS Studios).

In 1999, Clear Channel Communications acquired Citicasters and Jacor. The Citicasters name lived on as a holding company and licensee under the Clear Channel corporate structure; the two subsidiaries with the name were eliminated at the end of 2020 as part of a reorganization of iHeartMedia's subsidiaries.

Stations formerly owned by Taft Broadcasting and its successors
Stations are arranged in alphabetical order by state and city of license.

Notes:
 Two boldface asterisks appearing following a station's call letters (**) indicate a station that was built and signed-on by Taft.

Television stations

Note:
 1 Prior to full ownership, Taft held a 30% interest in WBIR between 1956 and 1959.

Radio stations
(a partial listing)

Note:
 1 Prior to full ownership, Taft held a 20% interest in the station from 1951 to 1953. The stake was increased to 30% from 1953 to 1959.

References

External links
 WTVN-TV History Page at the Early Television Foundation

 
1939 establishments in Ohio
1999 disestablishments in Ohio
American companies established in 1939
Mass media companies established in 1939
Mass media companies disestablished in 1999
Defunct broadcasting companies of the United States
Defunct radio broadcasting companies of the United States
Mass media companies of the United States
Television syndication distributors
Holding companies of the United States
Defunct companies based in Cincinnati
IHeartMedia
Companies formerly listed on the Nasdaq